The Abruzzo regional election of 1980 took place on 8 June 1980.

Events
Christian Democracy was by far the largest party, while the Italian Communist Party came distantly second.

After the election Romeo Ricciuti, the incumbent Christian Democratic President, formed a new regional government, but as soon as in 1981, he was replaced by Anna Nenna D'Antonio and later, since 1983, by Felice Spadaccini.

Results

Source: Ministry of the Interior

Elections in Abruzzo
1980 elections in Italy
June 1980 events in Europe